On the afternoon of April 16, 2022, a mass shooting occurred at the Columbiana Centre shopping mall in Columbia, South Carolina. Ten people were reported to have been struck by gunfire. Two others were reported to have been injured in the evacuation of the building. No fatalities have been reported. Three people with firearms were reported to have been detained, although only one was said to have fired their gun. A black male suspect was arrested. According to Orlando, Florida's WFTV, injuries were later reported to be increased to 14.

Suspects 
Columbia Police chief said that Columbia Police have arrested Marquise Love Robinson (20) and Jewayne Marquise Price (22), both of which were residents of Columbia. They have been charged with nine counts of assault, a battery of a high and aggravated nature, and attempted murder. Robinson was also charged with unlawful carry of a handgun. A third suspect, Amari Sincere-Jamal Smith (21), was arrested after he turned himself in.

All suspects are being held without bond at the Lexington County Detention Center in Lexington.

Lawsuit 
On July 19, 2022, two anonymous sisters, who were victims of the shooting, filed a lawsuit against the Columbiana Mall for "negligence, gross negligence, and recklessness for failing to provide adequate safety or protection to tenants and shoppers." The sisters are seeking $20 million in the lawsuit against the shopping mall.

See also
 List of mass shootings in the United States in 2022

References

2022 in South Carolina
2022 mass shootings in the United States
April 2022 crimes in the United States
History of Columbia, South Carolina
Mass shootings in South Carolina
Mass shootings in the United States
Non-fatal shootings
Attacks on shopping malls